A Warm Reception is a 1916 American silent short film featuring Oliver Hardy.

Cast
 Oliver Hardy as Babe (as Babe Hardy)
 Kate Price as Mrs. Price
 Joe Cohen as Count De Appetyte
 Florence McLaughlin as Mrs. Price's daughter (as Florence McLoughlin)

See also
 List of American films of 1916
 Oliver Hardy filmography

External links

1916 films
1916 comedy films
American silent short films
American black-and-white films
1916 short films
Silent American comedy films
American comedy short films
1910s American films